Moribund refers to a literal or figurative state near death.

Moribund may refer to:

 Moribund (album), a 2006 album by the Norwegian black metal band Koldbrann
 "Le Moribond", a song by Jacques Brel known in English as "Seasons in the Sun"
 Moribund language, a language likely to become extinct without intervention
 Moribund Oblivion, a Turkish black metal band from Istanbul
 Moribund Records, a heavy metal record label
 "Moribund the Burgermeister", a 1977 song by British progressive rock musician Peter Gabriel

See also
 Near Death Experience (disambiguation)